The Best-of-7 2011 Korean Series began on Tuesday, October 25th, at the Daegu Baseball Stadium in Incheon. It featured the Samsung Lions, who had claimed homefield advantage by finishing in first place at the end of the regular season, and the SK Wyverns, who finished second during the regular season and defeated the Lotte Giants in a best-of-5 playoff series (3 games to 2) to advance to the Finals. The Samsung Lions won the series in five games to collect their fifth Korean Series championship.

Matchups

Game 1
Tuesday, October 25, 2011 at Daegu Baseball Stadium in Daegu

Game 2
Tuesday, October 28, 2011 at Daegu Baseball Stadium in Daegu

Game 3
Saturday, October 28, 2011 at Munhak Baseball Stadium in Incheon

Choi Dong-soo (SK, 40 years, 1 month and 16 days) set a record for the oldest player to hit a home run in the Korean Series. (previous record: Park Kyung-Oan (SK): 38 years, 3 months and 7 days in 2010)

Game 4
Monday, October 29, 2011 at Munhak Baseball Stadium in Incheon

Game 5
Tuesday, October 19, 2010 at Jamsil Baseball Stadium in Seoul

Samsung Lions closer Oh Seung-Hwan was named the series MVP.

References

Korean Series
Samsung Lions
SSG Landers
Korean Series